Western Popoloca is an indigenous language of Puebla state, Mexico. There are two principal varieties, sometimes counted as distinct languages, 
Santa Inés Ahuatempan Popoloca (a.k.a. Ahuatempan, Santa Inés)
San Felipe Otlaltepec Popoloca (a.k.a. Otlaltepec, San Felipe)
which are about 75% mutually intelligible. Approximately half of ethnic Popoloca of these towns speak the language.

Phonology

Vowels

Consonants 

Sounds [, ] only occur from loanwords.

References

Popolocan languages

External links 

 San Felipe Otlaltepec resources in the Archive of the Indigenous Languages of Latin America